Diamond is an unincorporated community in eastern Palmyra Township, Portage County, Ohio, United States. It has a post office with the ZIP code 44412. The community is part of the Akron Metropolitan Statistical Area. Interstate 76 travels near Diamond. The town used to be a stop on the New York Central Railroad, but the stop was abandoned in the early 1970s.

A post office called Diamond has been in operation since 1880. Diamond was originally a coal mining community, and the Black Diamond Coal Company operated there.

Notable person
Larry Kehres, athletic director and former football coach for the University of Mount Union, with the highest winning percentage in college football history.

References

Unincorporated communities in Portage County, Ohio
Unincorporated communities in Ohio